Mong Ko, sometimes spelled Mongko or Monekoe and also known as Man Kan, Man Guo and Panglong, is a town in Mu Se Township, Mu Se District, northern Shan State. 

Like many towns in the region, Mong Ko is known to be a hotspot for drug production and trade.

Geography
Mong Ko lies by the China–Myanmar border, 25 km east of Pang Hseng (Kyu Koke). There is a border checkpoint in the town. The town on the Chinese part of the border is Manghai in Mangshi county-level city, Yunnan Province.

History
The Communist Party of Burma (CPB) entered Shan State on New Year Day 1968, captured Mong Ko, and established the first war zone ‘303’ of the CPB North-East Command (NEC). This was quickly followed by ‘404’ in Kokang substate winning over the local warlord Pheung Kya-shin.

For 20 years Pheung controlled Kokang as a member of the Communist Party of Burma. In 1989, however, the CPB split up and Pheung established his own army, the Myanmar National Democratic Alliance Army, with which he mutinied and captured Mong Ko town. After this he signed a cease-fire with the military junta, which allowed the Kokang army to retain their weapons, and established an autonomous Kokang region as the "First Special Region" of Myanmar.

The Northern Alliance launched an offensive to capture Mong Ko on 20 November 2016. The town was recaptured by the Myanmar Army in December 2016.

Further reading
 Myanmar: IDP Sites in Kachin and northern Shan States - Mimu

References

External links
Xinhuanet, Dec 20, 2016 - Over 900 displaced persons return to Mongko

Populated places in Shan State
China–Myanmar border crossings